Dilceu Rocha Júnior (born 21 April 1981), known as Júnior Rocha, is a Brazilian football manager and former player who played as a forward.

Honours

Player
Luverdense
 Campeonato Mato-Grossense: 2009

Manager
Luverdense
 Campeonato Mato-Grossense: 2016
 Copa Verde: 2017

References

External links
 

1981 births
Living people
People from São Leopoldo
Brazilian footballers
Association football forwards
Clube 15 de Novembro players
Canoas Sport Club players
Esporte Clube Novo Hamburgo players
Luverdense Esporte Clube players
Brazilian football managers
Campeonato Brasileiro Série B managers
Campeonato Brasileiro Série C managers
Luverdense Esporte Clube managers
Grêmio Novorizontino managers
Santa Cruz Futebol Clube managers
Clube de Regatas Brasil managers
Ypiranga Futebol Clube managers
Figueirense FC managers
Sportspeople from Rio Grande do Sul